(born April 13, 1980) is a Japanese luger who has competed since 2000. He finished 12th in the men's doubles event at the 2006 Winter Olympics in Turin.

Toshiro's best finish at the FIL World Luge Championships was eighth in the mixed team event at Park City, Utah in 2005.

References
 2006 luge men's doubles results
 CBS Sportsline.com profile
 FIL-Luge profile
 
 Sports-Reference.com profile

External links
 
 
 

1980 births
Living people
Japanese male lugers
Olympic lugers of Japan
Lugers at the 2006 Winter Olympics